Prunus carduchorum is a rare species of wild almond native to Turkey, Iraq and Iran, near where the three countries meet. It is a subspinescent shrub 0.5-1.2 mtall. A native of the Eastern Anatolian montane steppe ecoregion, it prefers to grow at 1500 to 3000m above sea level on marl slopes, in degraded oak forests. Genetically it groups with other scrubby almonds from the region. Based on morphology it was thought to yield Prunus × pabotii when crossed with Prunus haussknechtii.

Etymology
The specific epithet, carduchorum, means "of the Carduchi, the wild tribesman of Kurdistan who so severely harried Xenophon and the Ten Thousand".

References 

carduchorum
Flora of Turkey
Flora of Iraq
Flora of Iran
Plants described in 1965
Taxa named by Joseph Friedrich Nicolaus Bornmüller
Taxa named by Robert Desmond Meikle